Mera Qasoor Kya Hai is a 1964 Indian Hindi-language film starring Dharmendra, Nanda and Om Prakash. The film's music is by Chitragupta.

Lyrics and dialogue of the film are by Rajinder Krishan

Cast
 Dharmendra
 Mohan Choti
 Babloo
 Raj Mehra
 Nanda
 Om Prakash
 Randhir (actor)
 Shashikala

Music

All songs written by Rajinder Krishan

"Mujhe Kabhi Kabhi Sapna Yeh Aaye" - Suman Kalyanpur
"Mera Kasoor Kya Hai" - Lata Mangeshkar
"Koi Aane Wala Hai Chand" - Lata Mangeshkar, Mahendra Kapoor
"Saazishe Thi Mere Mitane Ki" - Lata Mangeshkar
"Kahin se maut ko lao ke gham Ki Raat Kate" - Mohammed Rafi
"Kaanton Pe Chal Ke, Kahin Se Maut Ko Laao" - Mohammed Rafi
"Aate Hai Tashrif Late Hai" - Usha Mangeshkar
"Akhiyan Apni Bacha Ke Rakh Goriye Jamana Shrabi Ban Jaaygi" - Mohammed Rafi

References

External links 
 

1964 films
1960s Hindi-language films
Films directed by Krishnan–Panju
Films scored by Chitragupta